Behind Monastery Walls is a 1928 German silent drama film directed by Franz Seitz and starring Karl Neubert, Georg Jacoby and Georg Henrich.

The film's sets were designed by Ludwig Reiber. It was shot at the Bavaria Studios in Munich.

Cast

References

Bibliography

External links

1928 films
Films of the Weimar Republic
German silent feature films
Films directed by Franz Seitz
Bavaria Film films
Works set in monasteries
German black-and-white films
German drama films
1928 drama films
Films shot at Bavaria Studios
Silent drama films
1920s German films